Ailton is a given name. Notable people with the name include:

Arts and Entertainment
 Ailton Krenak (born 1954), Brazilian writer and journalist
 Ailton Graça (born 1964), Brazilian actor

Religion
 Ailton Menegussi (born 1962), Brazilian bishop

Sportspeople
 Aílton Lira (born 1951), Brazilian football forward
 Ailton dos Santos Silva (born 1966), Brazilian football manager
 Aílton Ferraz (born 1966), Brazilian football forward and manager
 Aílton (footballer, born 1968), born Aílton Delfino, Brazilian football striker 
 Aílton (footballer, born 1973), born Aílton Gonçalves da Silva, Brazilian football striker
 Aílton (footballer, born 1980), born Aílton de Oliveira Modesto, Brazilian football midfielder
 Aílton (footballer, born 1984), born Aílton José Almeida, Brazilian football forward
 Aílton Júnior (born 1987), born Jose Junior Pereira Ailton, Brazilian football defender
 Ailton Canela (1994-2016), Brazilian football forward who died in the Chapecoeanse plane crash
 Ailton Ferreira Silva (born 1995), Brazilian football left-back
 Ailton (Cape Verdean footballer) (born 1996), born Ailton César Duarte Silva, Cape Verdean football forward

See also

Portuguese masculine given names